Mitromorpha erycinella is a species of sea snail, a marine gastropod mollusk in the family Mitromorphidae.

Description

Distribution
This species occurs in the Caribbean Sea off Cuba.

References

 Espinosa J. & Ortea J. (2009) Nuevas especies cubanas del género Mitrolumna Bucquoy, Dautzenberg & Dollfus, 1883 (Mollusca: Neogastropoda: Turridae). Revista de la Academia Canaria de Ciencias 20(4): 9–14. page(s): 10

External links
  Espinosa, José, et al. "Moluscos marinos. Reserva de la Biosfera de la Península de Guanahacabibes." Instituto de Oceanología, La Habana, Cuba (2012).

erycinella
Gastropods described in 2009